The 2001 Women's Hockey Junior World Cup was the 4th edition of the Women's Hockey Junior World Cup. It was held from May 14 to May 26, 2001 in the CeNARD, in Buenos Aires, Argentina.

South Korea won the tournament for the first time after defeating Argentina 4–3 in a penalty shoot-out following a 2–2 draw in the final. Defending champions the Netherlands lost the third-place match to Australia 2–0.

Qualification
Each continental federation received a number of quotas depending on the FIH World Rankings for teams qualified through their junior continental championships. Alongside the host nation, 15 teams competed in the tournament.

 – Due to the lack of other competing teams in the Oceania qualifier, New Zealand were invited to compete despite losing to Australia.
 – China withdrew from participating prior to the tournament; the first reserve team was Wales, thanks to their seventh place finish at the European qualifier.
 – Ukraine withdrew from participating prior to the tournament, however they were not replaced by the second reserve team.

Results

First round

Pool A

Pool B

Pool C

Pool D

Medal round

Pool E

Pool F

Non-Medal Round

Pool G

Pool H

Thirteenth to fifteenth place classification

Crossover

Thirteenth and fourteenth place

Ninth to twelfth place classification

Crossover

Eleventh and twelfth place

Ninth and tenth place

Fifth to eighth place classification

Crossover

Seventh and eighth place

Fifth and sixth place

First to fourth place classification

Semi-finals

Third and fourth place

Final

Awards

Statistics

Final standings

Goalscorers

External links
Official FIH website

Women's Hockey Junior World Cup
International women's field hockey competitions hosted by Argentina
International sports competitions in Buenos Aires
Junior World Cup
hockey World Cup
2000s in Buenos Aires
Hockey Junior World Cup
Hockey Junior World Cup
 Sports competitions in Buenos Aires